1921 is a year.

1921 may also refer to:

"1921" (song), a song by The Who on their 1969 album Tommy
1921 (1988 film), an Indian Malayalam-language historical film
1921 (2018 film), an Indian Hindi-language horror film
1921 (2021 film), a China Chinese-language film